The Ferrari SF-23 (also known by its internal name, Project 675) is a Formula One racing car designed and constructed by Scuderia Ferrari competing in the 2023 Formula One World Championship.

The car is driven by Charles Leclerc and Carlos Sainz Jr.

Design and development
On 22 December 2022, Ferrari announced that the car would be launched on 14 February 2023. The car was revealed as SF-23 on 7 February 2023, a week before the official launch.

Complete Formula One results
(key)

* Season still in progress.

References

External links
 Official website

SF-23